Devon Patricia Scott (born November 29, 1958) is a former American actress and daughter of actor/producer George C. Scott. She starred in the first season of The Tony Randall Show, which ran from 1976 to 1978; she was replaced for the second season. She is the elder half-sister of actor Campbell Scott.

Filmography

References

External links

1958 births
Living people
American expatriates in the United Kingdom
American film actresses
American television actresses
Place of birth missing (living people)
21st-century American women